Bloody Isshq is a 2013 Bollywood Romantic Suspense Drama film directed by Arup Dutta of Morning Walk fame. The film stars Akash, Shilpa Anand  and Tripta Parashar. It began filming on November 2011, and is slated to release in 2013.

Plot
Natasha is the Hotel Heiress of Eagle Group of Hotels, brash, defiant and a man-eater. While travelling to a party, she meets with an accident which is life-threatening, had it not been for the presence of Nirvaan Shroff. Nirvaan saves Natasha from the accident but his attitude and rough around the edges persona attracts her to him, but Nirvaan is not the one to be taken in easily. A wager from her friend starts the game of seduction between Natasha and Nirvaan. 
But what unfolds is something that even Natasha had not thought of. She actually falls for him, not knowing the fact that Nirvaan is married to Radhika who is staying in Pattaya. What happens next and what Nirvaan does is what forms the finale of Bloody Isshq

Cast
  Akash Singh as Nirvaan Shroff
 Shilpa Anand as Radhika
 Tripta Pareshar as Natasha Kapoor
 Mukesh Tiwari as Officer Vikram Rathod
 Simran Sachdeva as Sayani das
 Karan Mehra as Rahul
 Vikram Sahu as Mr. Oberoi
 Manoj Tiger as VIP Singh
 Shubham as Jatin Grewal
 Kuldeep Mallik
 Daisy Shah (Item Number)

Soundtrack
The music was composed by zubeen & Ashok Bhadra and released by Worldwide Records Limited. All lyrics were written by Kumaar.

References

External links
 
 

2013 films
2010s Hindi-language films
Indian romantic drama films
Indian romantic thriller films
Indian thriller drama films
2013 romantic drama films
2010s romantic thriller films
2013 thriller drama films